Charles Iain Kerr, 1st Baron Teviot, DSO, MC (3 May 1874 – 7 January 1968), was a British politician.

Kerr was the son of Charles Wyndham Rodolph Kerr and the great-grandson of William Kerr, 6th Marquess of Lothian. His mother was Anna Maria Olivia, daughter of Admiral Sir George Elliot. He achieved the rank of Lieutenant-Colonel in the Royal Horse Guards and was awarded the Distinguished Service Order and the Military Cross. Kerr entered the House of Commons at the Montrose Burghs by-election in 1932 as a member of the National Liberal Party. He was Chief Whip of the National Liberals and served as a Junior Lord of the Treasury (government whip) from 1937 to 1939 and as Comptroller of the Household from 1939 to 1940 in the National Government. On 27 June 1940 he was raised to the peerage as Baron Teviot, of Burghclere in the County of Southampton. He then served as Chairman of the Liberal National Party (from 1948 known as the National Liberal Party) from 1940 to 1956. He was also a member of the anti-semite Right Club.

Lord Teviot married, firstly, Muriel Constance, daughter of William Gordon Canning, in 1911. They had no children and were divorced in 1930. He married, secondly, Florence Angela, daughter of Charles Walter Villiers, in 1930. In 1960 he unsuccessfully moved to ban publication of Lady Chatterley's Lover and all books akin. Teviot died in January 1968, aged 93, and was succeeded in the barony by his only son from his second marriage, Charles. Lady Teviot died in 1979.

Arms

Citations

References
Kidd, Charles, Williamson, David (editors). Debrett's Peerage and Baronetage (1990 edition). New York: St Martin's Press, 1990,

External links 
 

1874 births
1968 deaths
Companions of the Distinguished Service Order
Kerr, Charles
Ministers in the Chamberlain peacetime government, 1937–1939
Ministers in the Chamberlain wartime government, 1939–1940
National Liberal Party (UK, 1931) politicians
Barons created by George VI
Recipients of the Military Cross
Royal Horse Guards officers
Kerr, Charles
Kerr, Charles
UK MPs who were granted peerages